Quinchilca is a mission located east of city of Los Lagos, Chile. Quinchilca was once one of the many missions built around Valdivia to evangelize the native Huilliches.  

Geography of Los Ríos Region
Roman Catholic churches in Chile
Buildings and structures in Los Ríos Region